Bill Armstrong (born June 24, 1955) is a former American football defensive back who played two seasons with the Hamilton Tiger-Cats of the Canadian Football League (CFL). He was drafted by the Cleveland Browns of the National Football League (NFL) in the eighth round of the 1977 NFL Draft. Armstrong played college football at Wake Forest University.

College career
Armstrong played for the Wake Forest Demon Deacons from 1973 to 1976. He was originally a quarterback before converting to defensive back his sophomore year. He was Wake Forest's first consensus football All-American in 1976. Armstrong also earned Associated Press Third-team All-American honors in 1975. He garnered First-team All-ACC recognition in 1975 and 1976. He was selected to the 1977 East–West Shrine Game. Armstrong set a school record for most career unassisted tackles with 271 while also recording 402 total tackles. He won the Arnold Palmer Award, which is given to Wake Forest's best male athlete, in 1976. He was inducted into the Wake Forest Sports Hall of Fame in 1996. Armstrong was named to the ACC 50th Anniversary team in 2002. He was also named an ACC Legend in 2005. His number 19 has been retired by the Wake Forest Demon Deacons.

Professional career
Armstrong was selected by the Cleveland Browns of the NFL with the 213th pick in the 1977 NFL Draft. He was released by the Browns on September 9, 1977. He played in five games for the Hamilton Tiger-Cats of the CFL from 1977 to 1978.

References

External links
Just Sports Stats

Living people
1955 births
American football defensive backs
American football quarterbacks
Canadian football defensive backs
American players of Canadian football
Wake Forest Demon Deacons football players
Cleveland Browns players
Hamilton Tiger-Cats players
All-American college football players
Players of American football from New Jersey
People from Randolph, New Jersey